Classic Disney: 60 Years of Musical Magic is a five-volume compilation series, each containing 25 (125 in total) songs compiled from Disneyland and Walt Disney World, various Disney films in animation and live-action, and the Walt Disney anthology television series. Each volume was released individually on CD and cassette between 1995 and 1998. Volume One was released on March 28, 1995, Volume Two on September 12, 1995, Volume Three on July 2, 1996, Volume Four on July 15, 1997 and Volume Five on September 22, 1998. In 2000, a box set was released containing volumes 1 - 3, followed by a box set containing volumes 1 - 4 in 2001, Finally, a box set containing all five volumes packaged in a slipcase was released by Walt Disney Records in Australia, Japan, North America and Europe in 2003.

The series was followed by Disney's Greatest, a three-volume compilation series released in 2001 and 2002. The series was very similar to Classic Disney and although each volume featured many of the same songs, only 20 songs appeared on each volume as opposed to Classic Disney'''s 25. In addition to containing only 20 songs, the Disney's Greatest compilations also contained songs from films released from 1999 - 2002, after the Classic Disney compilations were released.

Track listing
Volume 1 - Red
Unless otherwise indicated, Information is based on the albums' Liner Notes

Volume 2 - Blue
Information is based on the albums' Liner Notes

Volume 3 - Green

Information is based on the albums' Liner Notes

Volume 4 - Purple

Unless otherwise indicated, Information is based on the albums' Liner Notes

Volume 5 - Orange
Unless otherwise indicated, Information is based on the album's Liner Notes

ReceptionThe Melbourne Age called the collection "pure joy", saying that "the Disney policy of hiring quality songwriters and the best voicing talent has produced top-drawer popular songs that stand the test of time."The Palm Beach Post'' said that "the set covers an amazing bit of ground," and gave "credit to the producers for including some harder-to-find material."

See also
The Disney Collection: The Best-Loved Songs from Disney Motion Pictures, Television, and Theme Parks

References

Amazon's Information on album

2004 compilation albums
Disney film soundtracks
Walt Disney Records compilation albums